Ziggy Ramo Burrmuruk Fatnowna, known professionally as Ziggy Ramo, is an Australian singer.

Early life
Ziggy Ramo Burrmuruk Fatnowna was born to an Aboriginal and Solomon Islander father and a mother of Scottish heritage in Bellingen, New South Wales and brought up across Arnhem Land and Perth, Western Australia.

Ramo Burrmuruk Fatnowna moved to Perth when he was six years old and began pursuing music in his mid-teens, the social messaging of classic US hip-hop resonating with him. After graduating from school, he  embarked on a Pre-Medicine degree, determined to advocate for Indigenous health, before switching back to music, aiming to represent Indigenous Australian perspectives in rap.

Career

In 2015, Ramo completed his debut album Black Thoughts; an album that incisively addressed colonial dispossession, systemic racism and intergenerational trauma. Yet he worried that non-Indigenous Australia wasn't ready to engage with his truth-telling, so he shelved the album. Instead, in 2016, an EP of the same name was released.

The EP spawns the singles "Black Thoughts" and "Black Face".

Following the murder of George Floyd in Minneapolis on 25 May 2020, and the subsequent global Black Lives Matter protests against police brutality, Fatnowna decided to "rush release" the album saying "It was just still so relevant".

In August 2020, Ramo performed the album live at Sydney Opera House as part of its From Our House to Yours weekly program. In March 2021 Ramo was the headline artist at the Adelaide Festival's hip hop finale concert which featured an all-Indigenous line-up of artists. Other performers included Jimblah, JK-47 and J-Milla.

In December 2022, Ramo released "Sugar Coated Lies" featuring Alice Skye from the series Black Snow, in which Ramo made his screen debut. On 26 January 2023, Ramo released his second studio album.

Influences
Ramo lists his musical influences including Lauryn Hill and Yasiin Bey and Aboriginal activists such as Charlie Perkins and Gary Foley.

Discography

Studio albums

Extended plays

Singles

Awards and nominations

Australian Music Prize
The Australian Music Prize (the AMP) is an annual award of $30,000 given to an Australian band or solo artist in recognition of the merit of an album released during the year of award. They commenced in 2005.

|-
| 2020
| Black Thoughts
| Album of the Year
| 
|}

J Award
The J Awards are an annual series of Australian music awards that were established by the Australian Broadcasting Corporation's youth-focused radio station Triple J. They commenced in 2005.

! 
|-
| J Awards of 2020
| himself
| You Done Good Award
| 
| 
|-
| J Awards of 2021
| "Little Things" (with Paul Kelly) 
| Australian Video of the Year
| 
|

National Indigenous Music Awards
The National Indigenous Music Awards (NIMA) recognise excellence, dedication, innovation and outstanding contribution to the Northern Territory music industry.

|-
| 2018
| "himself"
| Best New Talent
| 
|-

West Australian Music Industry Awards
The Western Australian Music Industry Awards (commonly known as WAMis) are annual awards presented to the local contemporary music industry, put on by the Western Australian Music Industry Association Inc (WAM).

 (wins only)
|-
| rowspan=2| 2017
| rowspan=2| Ziggy Ramo
| Best Hip Hop Act 
| 
|-
| Best Indigenous Act
| 
|-

References

Australian male rappers
Indigenous Australian musicians
Living people
Year of birth missing (living people)